Busby is the English name for the Hungarian  ('fur shako') or , a military head-dress made of fur, originally worn by Hungarian hussars. In its original Hungarian form the busby was a cylindrical fur cap, having a bag of coloured cloth hanging from the top. This bag could be filled with sand and the end attached to the right shoulder as a defence against sabre cuts.

History

The popularity of the military headdress in its hussar form reached a height in the years immediately before World War I (1914–1918). It was widely worn in the Belgian (Guides and field artillery), British (hussars, yeomanry, and horse artillery), Dutch (cavalry and artillery), Italian (light cavalry) German (hussars), Russian (hussars),, Serbian (Royal Guard) and Spanish (hussars and mounted cazadores) armies. Several armies have continued to use the headdress as a part of their full dress uniforms.

There were some variations in the materials of which cavalry busbies were made. Russian Cossacks of the Imperial Guard used black sheepskin, Guard Hussars dark brown long-haired fur, and line Hussars black lambswool. All but one of the twenty Prussian Hussar regiments wore sealskin busbies dyed in black, while their officers favoured dark brown otter-skin. The Brunswick Hussar Regiment No. 17 had the distinction of being issued busbies made of bearskin.

Etymology
Possibly the name's original sense of a "busby wig" came from association with Richard Busby, headmaster of Westminster School in the late seventeenth century; the phrase buzz wig may have supplied the derivation for busby. An alternative explanation is that the British hussar cap of the early 19th century was named after the hatter who supplied the officer's version—W. Busby of the Strand London.

Modern use by country

Canada
The Canadian Forces dress instructions authorise the busby as a part of the full dress uniform for hussars, artillery and rifle regiments.

Netherlands
The historic busby is still worn by ceremonial detachments of the Dutch Hussars and Royal Gendarmerie (Koninklijke Marchaussee) in full dress uniform.

United Kingdom
In the United Kingdom busbies are of two kinds: (a) the hussar busby, cylindrical in shape, with a bag; this is worn by hussars and the Royal Horse Artillery; (b) the rifle busby, a folding cap of astrakhan (curly lambswool) formerly worn by rifle regiments, in shape somewhat resembling a Glengarry but taller. Both have straight plumes in the front of the headdress. The headdress is worn with full dress by the Waterloo Band of The Rifles, the Royal Horse Artillery and ceremonial detachments at regimental expense. In its hussar version it is now made of black nylon fur, although Bandmasters still retain the original animal fur. The busby should not be mistaken for the much taller bearskin cap, worn most notably by the five regiments of Foot Guards of the Household Division (Grenadier, Coldstream, Scots, Irish and Welsh Guards). Around 1900 the word "busby" was used colloquially to denote the tall bear and racoonskin "caps" worn by foot guards and fusiliers and the feather bonnets of Highland infantry. This usage is now obsolete.

See also
Canadian military fur wedge cap
Forage cap
Side cap
Sailor cap

References

Hats
History of clothing (Western fashion)
Military uniforms
Military hats